Bloody Britain is a British history documentary, presented by TV comedian Rory McGrath and produced by Sophie Theunissen for the Discovery Channel.

The series looks into Britain's more gruesome past, such as public executions and bloody battles. The show uses computer animation to create a more realistic and in depth program.

Episode list  
 The Peasants' Revolt
 Jack the Ripper
 The Vikings
 The Welsh Rebellions
 The Monmouth Rebellion
 The Witchfinder General
 The Siege of Rochester
 The Body Snatchers
 Bloody Mary
 The Battle of Trafalgar

External links  
Bloody Britain Official Website

2004 British television series debuts
2000s British documentary television series
2004 British television series endings